South Shaanxi Road is an interchange station between Lines 1, 10 and 12 of the Shanghai Metro. It is situated within the inner ring-road on the boundary between  Huangpu District and Xuhui District.

The newest line that the station serves is Line 12 which opened on 19 December 2015. During the construction of Line 12, interchanging between lines 1 and 10 required exiting the station and crossing a road. Passengers using a Shanghai Public Transportation Card were not charged an extra fare as long as they re-entered the station within 30 minutes; those using single-ride tickets, however, had to purchase a new ticket.

The main shopping mall at the station is IAPM which is placed at the crossing between the three lines, so it has direct underground entrances from lines 10 and 12. These entrances don't have metro exit numbers, so they are additional to the 10 numbered exits.

The station got its name from the road along which line 12 is lying, South Shaanxi Road. This is the South portion of Shaanxi Road, which in turn got its name from Shaanxi Province.

Places nearby
 IAPM Mall
 Huaihai Road, shopping street
 Xintiandi
 Xiangyang Park
 Jinjiang Hotel
 Sino-British College
 Shanghai Culture Plaza (former Canidrome site)
 Shanghai Museum of Arts and Crafts
 Yongkang Road which used to be the expats' favorite bar street.

Gallery

References

Railway stations in Shanghai
Railway stations in China opened in 1995
Shanghai Metro stations in Huangpu District
Shanghai Metro stations in Xuhui District
Line 1, Shanghai Metro
Line 10, Shanghai Metro
Line 12, Shanghai Metro